This is a list of Billboard magazine's ranking of the year's top country and western singles of 1959.

Johnny Horton's "The Battle of New Orleans" ranked as the year's No. 1 country and western record. It was released in April 1959, spent 10 weeks at the No. 1 spot, and remained on Billboards country and western chart for 21 weeks. It was also the No. 1 record of 1961 on the year-end pop chart.

"The Three Bells" by The Browns ranked No. 2 on the year-end country and western chart. It also ranked No. 7 on the year-end pop chart.

"Waterloo" by Stonewall Jackson was another cross-over hit, finishing at No. 4 on the year-end country chart and No. 32 on the year-end pop chart.

Columbia Records led all of the labels with 16 records on the year-end chart. RCA Victor followed with eight records on the chart. Decca was third with seven records.

See also
List of Hot C&W Sides number ones of 1959
List of Billboard Hot 100 number ones of 1959
1959 in country music

Notes

References

1961 record charts
Billboard charts
1961 in American music